Lake Como is a village in Buckingham and Preston Townships in Wayne County, Pennsylvania.

History 
The town is named after Lake Como in Italy.

Background 
Lake Como between 20 and 30 houses along its shores, inhabited by a mix of year-round residents and vacationers.

Nearby are summer camps Nesher, Lohikan, Wayne and Morasha. Landmarks include "The Fort," "The Rock Wall", and "Endless LW."

There are many species of fish in the private lake, including bass, chain pickerel, walleye, perch, blue-gills, crappies, sun-fish, and bullheads. There are also turtles, snakes, frogs and freshwater mussels.

References

Unincorporated communities in Pennsylvania
Unincorporated communities in Wayne County, Pennsylvania